The Geelong Flier was an Australian named passenger train operated by the Victorian Railways, running from Melbourne to Geelong. As the first officially named flagship service of the Victorian Railways, the train took pride of place on the timetable, and operated with some of the best available locomotives and rolling stock.

The first run was on 3 May 1926, departing from Flinders Street station Platform No.1 at 9:00 am, stopping only at Spencer Street before running express to Geelong, arriving at 10:10 am. The train left Geelong on the return journey at 4:00 pm, arriving at Flinders Street at 5:11 pm. The locomotive was A2906, fitted with Stephenson-link motion and superheating equipment, and the train consisted of an assortment of short W-class passenger cars.

Competing services
The Flier was introduced, under the leadership of Chief Commissioner Harold Clapp, to replace the railway-operated bus service from Melbourne to Geelong, and to allow the Victorian Railways to compete with a private bus service operating along the same route. The train ran daily except Sundays.

Acceleration projects
Patronage on the new service was high enough that further expenditure was justified. Within a few months the schedule was accelerated by ten minutes southbound and nine minutes northbound, due to the provision of Automatic Staff Exchange equipment at crossing loops on the single track between Newport South and North Geelong. By mid-1927 the train was regularly operating with more and larger carriages, using the newly built  Long W fleet to provide more seats for less train weight. However, those cars had a different roof style, so their introduction changed the appearance of the train.

Extension
From October 17, 1927, the train was extended to Port Fairy; the former  run was now . The train's title was simplified to The Flyer, and it saved 90 minutes for the whole journey, compared with the schedule of its predecessors. The W-class cars, supplemented with PL-class carriages, were utilised for passengers between Melbourne and Geelong, and detached there. The longer-distance passengers rode in E-class carriages.

The train was altered to depart from Spencer Street at 8:20 am, arriving at Geelong at 9:23 am, and waiting ten minutes to allow passengers to buy refreshments and to swap the engine for a lighter unit. It then proceeded to Birregurra at 10:35 am, Colac from 10:55 to 11:00 am, and arrived at Camperdown at 11:39 am. The train departed Camperdown at 11:59 pm and stopped all stations to Port Fairy, arriving at 2:59 pm. The train from Geelong to Melbourne was formed by a passenger service leaving Camperdown at 2:20pm, running express to Colac and Birregurra, then stopping at Armytage, Winchelsea, Buckley (on request), Moriac, Pettavel (on request), Grovedale (on request), Marshall (on request) and South Geelong, arriving at Geelong at 4:40 pm. The return train left Geelong station at 5:00 pm. Passengers could not travel on cheaper Excursion or Special Football tickets, and arrival was at Spencer Street Station at 6:05 pm.

To allow for the new timetable, 33 suburban services in the Melbourne area had to be adjusted, and to allow for the longer, heavier train, the schedule from Melbourne to Geelong was increased from 60 to 63 minutes. As better locomotives became available, the schedule was cut to 57 minutes outbound and 55 minutes inbound, and those times applied after 1938.

World War II reduced the priority given to passenger trains, and any engine might be used on The Flier, with resulting schedule penalties. Locomotives from the C, D3, K and N classes were all employed. By the end of the war, the portion of the A2 fleet fitted with Walschaerts valve gear had been converted to oil firing, which meant the performance of the locomotives was not restricted by the fireman's capacity to shovel coal, but that benefit did not outweigh problems caused by the deteriorated state of the rolling stock and track.

In 1951 the new R-class locomotives took over the run, and a few years later B-class diesel engines were introduced. The 1954 timetable had the train leaving Spencer Street at 8:25 am and arriving at Geelong at 9:20 am, continuing at 9:35 am and stopping at most stations (depending on the day) to Port Fairy, arriving at 2 pm. The train did not stop at Marshall, Buckley, Armytage or Crossley, and Pomborneit and Allansford were only serviced on Tuesdays through Thursdays. Warncoort, Larpent, Stoneyford, Garvoc and Cudgee were only served on Tuesdays, Thursdays and Saturdays, and Irrewarra, Pirron Yallock, Weerite, Boorcan and Panmure only on Mondays, Wednesdays and Fridays. South Geelong, Moriac, Winchelsea, Birregurra, Colac, Camperdown, Terang, Warrnambool, Koroit and Port Fairy were all served from Monday to Saturday.

On the return, the train identified as The Flier departed Geelong at 5:08 pm and ran express to Spencer Street Station, arriving 6:05 pm. There was no train from Port Fairy scheduled to form it, but the 3:05 pm Melbourne-bound train from Port Fairy (2:50 pm on Saturdays) had a similar stopping pattern from Port Fairy to Geelong to that of The Flier, and arrived at Spencer Street Station at 8:33 pm, or 8:10 pm on Saturdays. The stations served on particular days of the week were identical, except that all Melbourne-bound trains stopped at Pomborneit, even though only half the Port Fairy-bound trains stopped there.

Post-war, additional S type carriages were built which allowed some of the older air-conditioned carriages to be cascaded over to The Flier, and by 1960 the train was assembled with whatever stock was available, giving a mixture of classes, styles and colours.

The 1967 timetable shows The Flier as a Geelong service, leaving Spencer Street at 8:25 am for Geelong, arriving at 9:20 am (where it formed a Port Fairy train), and as a 5:12 pm train from Geelong, arriving at Spencer Street at 6:10 pm, extending to Flinders Street at 6:17 pm. There is no reference to The Flier on the Port Fairy timetable.

Legacy
In late 2019, Port Phillip Ferries began running an Incat-built, 403-seat ferry, named Geelong Flyer after the Geelong Football Club player Bob Davis who in turn was named after the former train service. The ferry initially operated a twice-daily service to and from Melbourne Docklands, using a mooring at the bottom of Moorabool Street. The service complemented the company's Portarlington to Docklands service, and was advertised as providing a more relaxed journey than the increasingly crowded trains on the Geelong-Melbourne line.

References

External links
 Rail Geelong website

Railway services introduced in 1954
Named passenger trains of Victoria (Australia)
Discontinued railway services in Australia